The futsal tournament at the 2013 Southeast Asian Games took place between December 9–20. This edition of the tournament featured both men's and women's tournaments. All matches took place in Wunna Theikdi Futsal, Naypyidaw. Official drawing took place on 6 November 2013 in Naypyitaw, Myanmar.

Participating teams

Men's tournament 
All times are Myanmar Time – UTC+6:30.

Group stage

Group A

Group B

Knockout stage

Semi-finals

Bronze medal match

Gold medal match

Goalscorers
8 goals
  Suphawut Thueanklang

5 goals
  Kritsada Wongkaeo

3 goals

  Pyae Phyo Maung (3)
  Jetsada Chudech
  Wiwat Thaijaroen
  Khanh Hung Ly

2 goals

  Ardy Suwardy
  Kita Souksabai
  Abu Haniffa
  Jirawat Sornwichian
  Piyapan Rattana
  Van Vu Tran
  That Phi Ton
  Thanh Tuan Pham

1 goal

  Bambang Saptaji
  Syahidansyah Lubis
  Andri Kustiawan
  Anza Rizal
  Aung Aung
  Pyae Phyo Maung (1)
  Saiful Nizam
  Shamsul Akmar
  Saiful Aula
  Asmie Amir
  Fitri Yatim
  Piyanat Nusaya
  Somphone Samphaonon
  Panida Sinthapaseuth
  Hoang Vinh Tran
  Quoc Nam Le
  Ngoc Hao Doan
  Xuan Du Vu

1 own goal
  Kyaw Kyaw Tun (against Malaysia)

Women's tournament 
All times are Myanmar Time – UTC+6:30.

Group stage

Gold medal match

Goalscorers
4 goals
  Orathai Srimanee

3 goals

  Thuy Trang Tran
  Huyen Linh Vu
  Hanis Farhana

2 goals

  Prapasporn Sriroj
  Darika Peanpailun
  Praephan Hengphio
  Fatin Shahida
  Darti Septiawati
  Maya Muharina

1 goal

  Jiraprapa Nimrattanasing
  Sasicha Phothiwong
  Vasinee Pakthongchai
  Chau Nguyen
  Ngoc Hoa Trinh
  Hai Yen Hoang
  Rani Mulyasari
  Maulina Novryliani
  Anggi Puspita Sari
  Siti Noor Halimi
  Shwe Zin Aung
  Nan Khan Mo
  Thu Zar Htwe

1 own goal
  Khin Mar Lin (against Vietnam)

Medal winners

References

2013 Southeast Asian Games events
Futsal at the Southeast Asian Games